Robert "Bobby" McAllister (born May 8, 1963 in Seattle, Washington) is an American soccer player.

Career

Professional
McAllister is recognized in the WSYSA "Best Soccer Ever" History Book in 2012 for his achievements in professional leagues, along with other Washington State Youth players that achieved professional leagues or Nation Team Player pools status. He played for the reserve team of the Seattle Sounders of the North American Soccer League in 1983, and played with the Yakima Reds in the USL for 5 seasons, 1996-2000.

Youth and College
McAllister graduated from Interlake High School where he was an All King County soccer player in 1981.  He then played soccer on scholarship at Bellevue Community College where he was the team captain when it went to the 1981 and 1982 Northwest Athletic Association of Community Colleges state championships.  He also was a two-time NWAACC all-star.

Personal
McAllister has taken his coaching career to the college ranks as an assistant at Western Washington University in 2001, after two years he left to focus on youth development through the Selah Parks and recreation programs, and started Selah F.C. before becoming a coach with the Yakima Reds USISL. McAllister has served as Technical Director of Player Development and Coaching Education Director for Yakima Youth Soccer Association / Crossfire Yakima, and is the Director of his own Soccer Academy. McAllister is also a regional scout for alliance partnership parent club Crossfire Premier in the Eastern WA region.

References

External links
 USL bio
 Sozo Sports
 
 Yakima Reds

American soccer coaches
American soccer players
Yakima Reds players
Living people
1963 births
Soccer players from Washington (state)
Association football midfielders